Coelachne is a genus of Asian, African, and Australian plants in the grass family.

 Species
 Coelachne africana Pilg. - tropical Africa incl Madagascar
 Coelachne auquieri Ndab.  - Rwanda
 Coelachne friesiorum C.E.Hubb. - Aberdare Range in Kenya
 Coelachne ghatica Naik - Western Ghats in India
 Coelachne infirma Buse - Madagascar, New Guinea, Maluku, Sulawesi, Philippines, Java, Sulawesi
 Coelachne japonica Hack. - Honshu, Kyushu
 Coelachne minuta Bor - Thailand, India
 Coelachne perpusilla (Nees ex Steud.) Thwaites -  Tamil Nadu, Sri Lanka, Laos, Thailand, Vietnam, Philippines
 Coelachne pulchella R.Br. - Myanmar, Vietnam, Queensland, Northern Territory
 Coelachne simpliciuscula (Steud.) Munro ex Benth. - Madagascar, Indian Subcontinent, China, Indochina, Philippines, Malaysia
 Coelachne soerensenii Bor - Thailand

 formerly included
see Isachne Limnopoa Micraira 
 Coelachne angolensis - Isachne angolensis 
 Coelachne meeboldii - Limnopoa meeboldii 
 Coelachne occidentalis - Isachne angolensis 
 Coelachne subulifolia - Micraira subulifolia

References

Micrairoideae
Grasses of Africa
Grasses of Asia
Poales of Australia
Poaceae genera
Taxa named by Robert Brown (botanist, born 1773)